Imperial Gazetteer may refer to the following reference works on parts of the colonial age British Empire :

 The Imperial Gazetteer of India
 and the parallel publications known as the Imperial Gazetteer of India: Provincial Series
 The Imperial Gazetteer of Scotland
 The Imperial Gazetteer of England and Wales